Fred Eppsteiner is an American Zen Buddhist teacher, trained in both Zen and Vajrayana-Dzogchen lineages.

Born and raised in a secular Jewish household, Eppsteiner spent part of his youth engaged in the Independent Socialist Clubs and International Socialists, authoring labor-focused articles. He began practicing Zen in the late 1960s at the Rochester Zen Center in upstate New York with Philip Kapleau. 

After befriending Thích Nhất Hạnh in France during the 70's, Eppsteiner traveled to India and studied Vajrayana-Dzogchen Buddhism from Tibetan monks. Eppsteiner became a member of the Order of Interbeing in 1983 and served as the editor for two of Thích Nhất Hạnh's books: The Path of Compassion, and Interbeing: The Fourteen Precepts of Engaged Buddhism, the latter establishing the framework for the Order of Interbeing. In 1994, Eppsteiner received Dharma Transmission from Nhất Hạnh, joining the lineage of the Linji school (Lâm Tế). Eppsteiner currently serves as the Dharma Teacher of the Florida Community of Mindfulness in Tampa, Florida.

Further reading
  Continued on page 2B.

See also
Timeline of Zen Buddhism in the United States
Order of Interbeing

References

Converts to Buddhism
American Zen Buddhists
Living people
Year of birth missing (living people)
Members of the International Socialists (United States)